The West Slavic languages are a subdivision of the Slavic language group. They include Polish, Czech, Slovak, Kashubian, Upper Sorbian and Lower Sorbian. The languages have traditionally been spoken across a mostly continuous region encompassing the Czech Republic, Slovakia, Poland, the westernmost regions of Ukraine and Belarus, and a bit of eastern Lithuania. In addition, there are several language islands such as the Sorbian areas in Lusatia in Germany, and Slovak areas in Hungary and elsewhere.

Classification 
West Slavic is usually divided into three subgroups—Czecho-Slovak, Lechitic and Sorbian—based on similarity and degree of mutual intelligibility. The groupings are as follows:

Some linguists include Upper and Lower Sorbian in the Lechitic branch, but other linguists regard it as a separate branch. The reason for this is that 'the Sorbian dialects are extremely diverse, and there are virtually no linguistic features common to all Sorbian dialects which distinguish them as a group from the other Slavic languages' (Sussex & Cubberly 2006). Czech and Slovak are more closely related to each other than to the other West Slavic languages, and also closer to each other than Polish and Sorbian are. Czecho-Slovak (Slovak in particular) shares certain features with other Slavic languages, such as Slovene and BCMS.

Distinctive features
Some distinctive features of the West Slavic languages, as from when they split from the East Slavic and South Slavic branches around the 3rd to 6th centuries AD (alternatively, between the 6th and 10th centuries), are as follows:
 Development of Proto-Slavic *tj, *dj into palatalized ts, (d)z, as in modern Polish/Czech/Slovak  ("night"; compare Russian );
 Retention of the groups kv, gv as in Polish  ("flower");  ("star") (Compare Russian  (cvet);  (zvezda));
 Retention of tl, dl, as in Polish/Slovak/Czech  ("ard"; compare Russian );
 The groups pj, bj, mj, vj developed into (soft) consonant forms without the epenthesis of l, as in Polish  ("I shall buy"; compare Russian );
 A tendency towards fixed stress (on the first syllable in Czech and Slovak and on the penultimate syllable in Polish);
 Use of the endings -ego or -ého for the genitive singular of the adjectival declension;
 Use of the pronoun form *tъnъ rather than *tъ, leading to Slovak/Polish/Czech  ("this" (masc.); compare Russian ; Old Church Slavonic тъ);
 Extension of the genitive form *čьso to nominative and accusative in place of čь(to), leading to Polish/Czech  ("what", compare Russian ; OCS чьто, genitive чьсо).

Although influences from other language families have contributed a lot of loanwords, and to a lesser extent to verb morphology and syntax, the Slavic languages retained a distinctly Slavic character, with clear roots in Indo-European.

The West Slavic languages are all written in the Latin script, while the East Slavic branch uses Cyrillic and the South Slavic branch is mixed.

History

The early Slavic expansion reached Central Europe in c. the 7th century, and the West Slavic dialects diverged from Common Slavic over the following centuries. West Slavic polities of the 9th century include   the Principality of Nitra and  Great Moravia. The Obotrites were given territories by Charlemagne in exchange for their support in his war against the Saxons.

In the high medieval period, the West Slavic tribes were again pushed to the east by the incipient German , decisively so following the Wendish Crusade in the 11th century. The Sorbs and other Polabian Slavs like Obodrites and Veleti came under the domination of the Holy Roman Empire and were strongly Germanized.  

The Bohemians established the Duchy of Bohemia in the 9th century, which was incorporated into the Holy Roman Empire in the early 11th century. At the end of the 12th century the duchy was raised to the status of kingdom, which was legally recognized in 1212 in the Golden Bull of Sicily. Lusatia, the homeland of the remaining Sorbs, became a crown land of Bohemia in the 11th century, and Silesia followed suit in 1335. The Slovaks, on the other hand, never became part of the Holy Roman Empire, being incorporated into the Kingdom of Hungary. Hungary fell under Habsburg rule alongside Austria and Bohemia in the 16th century, thus uniting the Bohemians, Moravians, Slovaks, and Silesians under a single ruler. While Lusatia was lost to Saxony in 1635 and most of Silesia was lost to Prussia in 1740, the remaining West Slavic Habsburg dominions remained part of the Austrian Empire and then Austria-Hungary, and after that remained united until 1992 in the form of Czechoslovakia.

Over the past century, there have been efforts by some to standardize and to recognize Silesian, Lachian, and Moravian as separate languages.

See also

Comparison of Czech and Slovak
 Outline of Slavic history and culture

References

Bibliography